Meerkat National Park is a large National Park in the Northern Cape, South Africa, that encompasses the Square Kilometre Array, MeerKAT and HERA telescopes. To ensure long term viability of the Karoo site for the MeerKAT and SKA projects, and for other radio astronomy instruments, the South African Parliament passed the Astronomy Geographic Advantage Act, in 2007. The act gives the Minister of Science and Technology the authority to protect areas, through regulations, that are of strategic national importance for astronomy and related scientific endeavours. The park does not allow visitors.

History 
The National Research Foundation purchased privately owned rangeland, removed livestock from the area and placed it under the protection of SANParks. In 2020, this park was declared in partnership with the National Research Foundation and the Square Kilometre Array project. It added 3.4% to South Africa's national parks. In addition to hosting the SKA project, one of the objectives in creating the park was to increase the protection range of three unprotected ecoregions, including the Nama Karoo ecoregion from 1.5% to 2%; and in doing so, conserve the vulnerable quiver tree forests and other threatened species in the region.

Objectives 
The park will seek to study large-scale management of the area, and the impact of climate change on the local ecosystem.

Ecology 
After declaring the park, a number of steps were taken to rehabilitate the land, including the removal of livestock, fences and copses of alien mesquite, this saw an increase in wildlife numbers. The park has a healthy population of quiver trees.

Biodiversity

Amphibians 

 Common sand frog
 Common caco
 Karoo toad

Birds 
There are estimated between 215 and 264 bird species, with 25 near endemic and two endemic species, the red lark and Sclater's lark.

 Black harrier
 Chestnut-banded plover
 Cinnamon-breasted warbler
 Karoo korhaan
 Kori bustard
 Lanner falcon
 Ludwig’s bustard 
 Martial eagle
 Secretary bird
 Verreaux’s eagle

Invertebrates 
Termites are thought to be found within the park with the existence of heuweltjies.

 Honey bee
 Harvester ant

Mammals 
There have been 29 species of mammal documented in the park, including three bat species:

 Aardvark
 Aardwolf
 Black-backed jackal
 Caracal
 Crested porcupine
 Natal long-fingered bat
 Rock hyrax
 Springbok
 Steenbok

Reptiles 

 Karoo tent tortoise

Vegetation 
Four Nama Karoo types of vegetation occur within the park:

 Western Upper Karoo
 Upper Karoo Hardeveld
 Bushmanland Basin Shrubland
 An aquatic type zone, Bushmanland Vloere

Gallery

See also 
 Protected areas of South Africa

References 

National parks of South Africa
Protected areas of the Northern Cape